Diehl Defence GmbH & Co. KG is a German arms manufacturer and a division of the Diehl Stiftung with headquarters in Überlingen. Diehl Defence mainly produces missiles and ammunition. Diehl BGT Defence was founded in 2004 as result of the merger of Bodenseewerke Gerätetechnik GmbH and Diehl Munitionssysteme GmbH & Co. KG. Diehl BGT Defence and Diehl Defence Holding are merged into Diehl Defence in February 2017.

In 1960, Bodenseewerke Gerätetechnik became the prime contractor for the European production of the American Sidewinder AIM-9B air-to-air missile. Based on the experience with the Sidewinder, Diehl developed a progressive new seeker for a new type of short-range air-to-air missile – the IRIS-T.

IRIS-T is currently being adopted by the German Air Force and other European air forces.

Products

AIM-9 Sidewinder
IRIS-T 
IRIS-T SL / IRIS-T SLS (in addition to MEADS)
AGM ARMIGER 
LFK NG
PARS 3 LR
Fliegerfaust 2 - Licensed development and production of the STINGER POST missile from the late 1980s onwards (from 2004 onwards in a joint venture with Raytheon). Diehl was originally project coordinator, with Dornier as general contractor and Bodenseewerk producing the guidance systems. Eventually Diehl absorbed the respective interests and responsibilities of those companies in the program.
GMLRS
RIM-116 Rolling Airframe Missile
RBS-15 
IDAS (submarine-launched missile, planned for the new Type 212 submarine)
Barracuda (supercavitating torpedo) 
EUROSPIKE
HOPE/HOSBO
Dornier Viper
SMART-Ammunition
Panzerfaust 3
DM51 Offensive-Defensive Hand Grenade
DM58 Practice Hand Grenade
DM61 Defensive Hand Grenade
DM78 Practice Hand Grenade
DM82 Hand Grenade Fuze
MK7 Mod 0 Floating Smoke Pot
76mm IR/RP Smoke Grenade
76mm IR/RP Airburst Grenade
80/81mm IR/RP Smoke Grenade
RASMO Rapid Smoke Hand Grenade

References

External links

Defence companies of Germany
Guided missile manufacturers
Companies based in Baden-Württemberg